The 2018 Smart Fibre Launceston International is a professional tennis tournament played on outdoor hard courts as part of the 2018 ATP Challenger Tour and the 2018 ITF Women's Circuit, offering a total of $75,000 in prize money for men and $25,000 for women. It was the fourth (for men) and seventh (for women) edition of the tournament.

Men's singles entrants

Seeds 

 1 Rankings as of 29 January 2018.

Other entrants 
The following players received wildcards into the singles main draw:
  Alex Bolt
  Harry Bourchier
  Andrew Harris
  Luke Saville

The following players received entry from the qualifying draw:
  Nathaniel Lammons
  Marinko Matosevic
  Gianni Mina
  Benjamin Mitchell

The following player received entry as a lucky loser:
  Lucas Catarina

Women's singles entrants

Seeds 

 1 Rankings as of 29 January 2018

Other entrants 
The following players received wildcards into the singles main draw:
  Kimberly Birrell
  Renee McBryde
  Kaylah McPhee
  Alana Parnaby

The following players received entry from the qualifying draw:
  Shuko Aoyama
  Alexandra Bozovic
  Allie Kiick
  Chihiro Muramatsu
  Himari Sato
  Riko Sawayanagi
  Yuuki Tanaka
  Olivia Tjandramulia

Champions

Men's singles 

  Marc Polmans def.  Bradley Mousley 6–2, 6–2.

Women's singles 
  Gabriella Taylor def.  Asia Muhammad, 6–3, 6–4

Men's doubles 

  Alex Bolt /  Bradley Mousley def.  Sekou Bangoura /  Nathan Pasha 7–6(8–6), 6–0.

Women's doubles 
  Jessica Moore /  Ellen Perez def.  Laura Robson /  Valeria Savinykh, 7–6(7–5), 6–4

External links 
 2018 Smart Fibre Launceston International at Tennis Australia

References 

2018 ITF Women's Circuit
2018 ATP Challenger Tour
2018 in Australian tennis
2018
February 2018 sports events in Australia